Jackson Township is a township in Jewell County, Kansas, USA.  As of the 2000 census, its population was 123.

Geography
Jackson Township covers an area of 35.74 square miles (92.57 square kilometers); of this, 0.32 square miles (0.84 square kilometers) or 0.91 percent is water. The stream of Crosby Creek runs through this township.

Cities and towns
 Webber

Adjacent townships
 Big Bend Township, Republic County (east)
 White Rock Township, Republic County (southeast)
 Sinclair Township (south)
 Richland Township (southwest)
 Montana Township (west)

Cemeteries
The township contains one cemetery, Spring Grove Elementary School.

References
 U.S. Board on Geographic Names (GNIS)
 United States Census Bureau cartographic boundary files

External links
 City-Data.com

Townships in Jewell County, Kansas
Townships in Kansas